is a 1968 Japanese drama film directed by Shiro Moritani. It is based on the story "The Lawyer" by attorney Hiroshi Masaki and his account of Japan's "Headless Murder Case" in which a police officer beat a suspect to death during the Pacific War.

Release
Judge and Jeopardy was distributed theatrically in Japan by Toho on 8 June 1968. In Japan, the film the awards for Best Film Score, Best Art Direction at the Mainichi Film Concours.

References

Bibliography

External links
 

1968 films
Toho films
Films produced by Tomoyuki Tanaka
1960s Japanese films